Idilio Cei (b. August 8, 1937, Monsummano Terme – d. March 24, 1996) was an  Italian football goalkeeper.

1937 births
1996 deaths
Italian footballers
Serie A players
Serie B players
Serie D players
A.S.D. Città di Foligno 1928 players
S.S. Lazio players
Palermo F.C. players
A.C.N. Siena 1904 players

Association football goalkeepers